The 1998 Australian motorcycle Grand Prix was the thirteenth round of the 1998 Grand Prix motorcycle racing season. It took place on 4 October 1998 at the Phillip Island Grand Prix Circuit.

500 cc classification

250 cc classification

125 cc classification

Championship standings after the race (500cc)

Below are the standings for the top five riders and constructors after round thirteen has concluded.

Riders' Championship standings

Constructors' Championship standings

 Note: Only the top five positions are included for both sets of standings.

References

Australian motorcycle Grand Prix
Australian
Motorcycle
Motorsport at Phillip Island